Furuholmen is a Norwegian surname. Notable people with the surname include:

Gunnerius Furuholmen (1861–1947), Norwegian engineer and politician 
Magne Furuholmen (born 1962), Norwegian musician and visual artist, and member of the band A-ha

Norwegian-language surnames